Siderado is the fourth studio album by Skank, released in 1998. It had the hits "Resposta" and "Mandrake e os Cubanos". Siderado has sold 750,000 copies.

Track listing

All tracks by Samuel Rosa and Chico Amaral, except where otherwise noted.

"Marginal Tietê"
"Do Ben" (Samuel Rosa/Marcelo Yuka)
"Resposta" (Samuel Rosa/Nando Reis)
"Siderado"
"Mandrake e os Cubanos"
"Os Homens das Cavernas"
"Romance Noir"
"Don Blás"
"Calipsoê"
"No Meio Do Mar"
"Saideira" (Samuel Rosa/Rodrigo F. Leão)

References

1998 albums
Skank (band) albums